The 1979 Skate America (officially called Norton Skate) was held in Lake Placid, New York. This was the inaugural event. It was the test event for the upcoming 1980 Winter Olympics. Medals were awarded in the disciplines of men's singles, ladies' singles, pair skating, and ice dancing.

Results

Men

Ladies

Pairs

Ice dancing

References

Skate America, 1979
Skate America
Norton Skate